Ralph Wimbledon (fl. 1413) was an English politician.

Family
He may have been the son of William Wimbledon, constable of Farnham Castle. His wife was named Isabel.

Career
He was a Member of the Parliament of England for Guildford in May 1413.

References 

Members of Parliament for Guildford
14th-century births
15th-century deaths
English MPs May 1413